Darlington's least gecko (Sphaerodactylus darlingtoni) is a species of lizard in the family Sphaerodactylidae. The species is endemic to the Dominican Republic.

Etymology
The specific name, darlingtoni, is in honor of American entomologist Philip Jackson Darlington, Jr., who collected the holotype.

The subspecific name, noblei, is in honor of American herpetologist Gladwyn Kingsley Noble.

Subspecies
Four subspecies are recognized as being valid, including the nominotypical subspecies.
Sphaerodactylus darlingtoni bobilini 
Sphaerodactylus darlingtoni darlingtoni 
Sphaerodactylus darlingtoni mekistus 
Sphaerodactylus darlingoni noblei

Habitat

Reproduction
S. darlingtoni is oviparous.

References

Further reading
Rösler H (2000). "Kommentierte Liste der rezent, subrezent und fossil bekannten Geckotaxa (Reptilia: Gekkonomorpha) ". Gekkota 2: 28–153. (Sphaerodactylus darlingtoni, p. 111). (in German).
Schwartz A, Henderson RW (1991). Amphibians and Reptiles of the West Indies: Descriptions, Distributions, and Natural History. Gainesville, Florida: University of Florida Press. 720 pp. . (Sphaerodactylus darlingtoni, p. 486).
Schwartz A, Thomas R (1975). A Check-list of West Indian Amphibians and Reptiles. Carnegie Museum of Natural History Special Publication No. 1. Pittsburgh, Pennsylvania: Carnegie Museum of Natural History. 216 pp. (Sphaerodactylus darlingtoni, p. 149). 
Shreve B (1968). "The notatus group of Sphaerodactylus (Sauria, Gekkonidae) in Hispaniola". Breviora (280): 1-28. (Sphaerodactylus darlingtoni, new species, pp. 15–16; S. noblei, new species, pp. 17–19).
Thomas R, Schwartz A (1983). "Part 2. Sphaerodactylus savagei, S. cochranae, S. darlingtoni, S. armstrongi, S. streptophorus, and conclusions". pp. 31–60. In: Schwartz A, Thomas R (1983). "The difficilis complex of Sphaerodactylus (Sauria, Gekkonidae) of Hispaniola". Bulletin of Carnegie Museum of Natural History (22): 1-60. (Sphaerodactylus darlingtoni bobilini, new subspecies; S. d. mekistus, new subspecies).

Sphaerodactylus
Reptiles of the Dominican Republic
Endemic fauna of the Dominican Republic
Reptiles described in 1968
Taxa named by Benjamin Shreve